César Menacho may refer to:
 César Menacho (sport shooter)
 César Menacho (footballer)